Bailou Township is a township of Sui County in Shangqiu, Henan, China. , it had 26 villages under its administration:
Bailou Village
Xigang Village
Tonglou Village
Bailou Yangzhuang Village
Malou Village
Qiancailiu Village
Junzhao Village
Magang Village
Zhuqiao Village
Siqiao Village
Jiangzhuang Village
Yuzhuang Village
Wangtang Village
Fanlou Village
Jindong Village
Jinxi Village
Wangguan Village
Jianglou Village
Guopi Village
Shunhenan Village
Shunhebei Village
Renzhuang Village
Fengzhuang Village
Sunlou Village
Qianyintang Village
Ruanwa Village

See also
List of township-level divisions of Henan

References

Township-level divisions of Henan
Sui County, Henan